Al-Assad Military Academy, also known as the Academy of Military Engineering, is a military educational and training institution in Aleppo, Syria. The square-kilometer campus hold 2,000 or so well-armed soldiers.

The academy was founded in 1979 during the rule of Hafez Al-Assad, then upgraded to grant Master's and PhD degrees in 2014. It provided basic training for infantry and armored corps conscripts and advanced training for army engineers.

References

Educational institutions established in 1979
Military academies of Syria
Educational institutions in Syria
Assad Military Academy
1979 establishments in Syria